Therapnae or Therapnai was a town of ancient Boeotia, in the territory of Thebes, between that city and the Asopus. Its site is not located.

References

Populated places in ancient Boeotia
Former populated places in Greece
Lost ancient cities and towns